Chetan Suryawanshi (born 24 February 1985) was the captain for the Singapore national cricket team. Singapore is his adoptive country and he has been playing for it since 2004.

Born in Pune, Maharashtra, India, Suryawanshi has been playing cricket since a very young age. His native village is Velu in Satara district.

Suryawanshi is a right-handed batsman and a right-arm medium pace bowler, although his primary role is wicketkeeper. He is often seen bowling his overs and then doing wicket keeping for the other bowlers in  the same match.

He has led Singapore's national team, most recently during the ICC World Cricket League Division 3 in Uganda. In one of the crucial 2009 ACC Twenty20 Cup tournaments, Suryawanshi was Singapore's leading run scorer in the tournament, with 204 runs. He scored a record 100 in 36 balls in the same tournament.

Suryawanshi has also represented Singapore in the World Cricket League. He was the captain of the 2011 Maharashtra Premier League for Devgiri Emperor which emerged as winners of the tournament, with Suryawanshi securing the Man of the Series Award.

On 13 February 2014, Suryawanshi took a hat-trick and scored 101 against Malaysia in the Malaysian Tri-Series tournament. He became the first cricketer to take a hat-trick and score a century in an international 50-overs match.

In August 2018, he was named the captain of Singapore's squad for the 2018 Asia Cup Qualifier tournament. In October 2018, he was named in Singapore's squad in the Eastern sub-region group for the 2018–19 ICC World Twenty20 Asia Qualifier tournament. Later the same month, he was named as the captain of Singapore's squad for the 2018 ICC World Cricket League Division Three tournament in Oman. Ahead of the tournament, he was named as the player to watch in Singapore's squad.

In July 2019, he was named in Singapore's Twenty20 International (T20I) squad for the Regional Finals of the 2018–19 ICC T20 World Cup Asia Qualifier tournament. He made his T20I debut for Singapore against Qatar on 22 July 2019.

References

External links
Chetan Suryawanshi on CricketArchive
Chetan Suryawanshi on Cricinfo

1985 births
Living people
Singaporean cricketers
Indian cricketers
Cricketers from Pune
Indian emigrants to Singapore
Singaporean sportspeople of Indian descent
Singapore Twenty20 International cricketers
Wicket-keepers